The High Commission of Guyana in London is the diplomatic mission of Guyana in the United Kingdom.

Gallery

References

External links
Official site

Guyana
Diplomatic missions of Guyana
Guyana–United Kingdom relations
Buildings and structures in the City of Westminster
Bayswater